Jane Eyre is a British television series which first aired on the BBC in 1963. It is an adaptation of the 1847 novel of the same title by Charlotte Brontë. Episodes 2 and 3 are missing, believed lost.

Cast
 Ann Bell as Jane Eyre
 Richard Leech as Mr. Rochester
 Elsie Arnold as Mrs. Fairfax
 Stephanie Bidmead as Leah
 Nan Marriott-Watson as Grace Poole
 Elaine Pratt as Adèle
 Hira Talfrey as Mrs. Rochester
 Patricia Cree as  Mary Ingram
 Brenda Dean as Mary Rivers
 William Devlin as Mr. Briggs
 Sonia Dresdel as Mrs. Reed
 Jane Eccles as Lady Ingram
 Alan Edwards as  Lord Ingram
 Betty Hardy as Hannah
 Anthony Jacobs as Mr. Mason
 Arthur Lawrence as  Colonel Dent
 Justine Lord as Blanche Ingram
 William Russell as St. John Rivers
 Penny Whittam as  Diana Rivers
 Elizabeth Benzimra as Alice
 Michael Bilton as Landlord 
 Rachel Clay as  Jane Eyre as a child 
 Mark Dignam as Mr. Brocklehurst
 Arthur Hewlett as Clergyman
 Marie Kean as Miss Miller
 Tonie MacMillan as Mrs. Brocklehurst
 Kika Markham as Helen Burns
 Jane Merrow as Rosamund Oliver
 Leonard Trolley as Doctor
 Margot Van der Burgh as Miss Temple
 Ann Way as  Bessie
 Meadows White as John
 Joan Young as Nurse

References

Bibliography
 Klossner, Michael. The Europe of 1500-1815 on Film and Television: A Worldwide Filmography of Over 2550 Works, 1895 Through 2000. McFarland & Company, 2002.

External links
 

BBC television dramas
1963 British television series debuts
1963 British television series endings
1960s British drama television series
English-language television shows
Television series set in the 19th century